Dharmadam railway station (code: DRMD) is a railway station in Kannur district, Kerala and falls under the Palakkad railway division of the Southern Railway zone, Indian Railways.

Railway stations in Kannur district
Railway stations opened in 1904